Kate O'Flynn is a British actress. She is known for her performance in National Theatre's production of Port for which she received a Critics' Circle Theatre Award in 2013, as well as starring roles in plays A Taste of Honey in 2014, and The Glass Menagerie for which she was nominated for a Laurence Olivier Award for Best Actress in 2017. 

On screen, she has appearances in the films Up There (2011) and Mr. Turner (2014), and television series  Kingdom (2009) Landscapers (2021) and Death in Paradise (2022).

Education and training
O'Flynn attended Manchester's Royal Exchange youth theatre as a teenager, before training at the Royal Academy of Dramatic Art (RADA).

Career 
O'Flynn's first professional role was in Mike Leigh's 2008 film Happy-Go-Lucky. Later that year, her performance in The Children's Hour with the Royal Exchange Theatre Company won her the 2008 TMA Theatre Award for Best Supporting Performance in a Play.

In 2009 Kate O'Flynn starred in the tv series Kingdom (2007-2009) with Stephen Fry, as Emily Cartright, council solicitor and girlfriend of trainee solicitor Lyle Anderson, played by Karl Davies. In the same year, O'Flynn appeared with Russell Tovey at London's Royal Court Theatre in Molly Davies' A Miracle. Michael Billington gave the play 3 stars out of five in his review for British newspaper The Guardian, finding that "Kate O'Flynn's Amy is a model of gawky despair" but concluding that the cast "fill out a play that provides plenty of evidence of youthful talent but that also leaves you wanting more". In the Evening Standard, Nicholas de Jongh praised O'Flynn's "beautiful rendering of passivity, selfishness and vulnerability", while The Daily Telegraph'''s Charles Spencer wrote, "Kate O'Flynn brings an astonishingly raw vulnerability to the stage as Amy, the tears streaming down her face as she describes how impossible she finds it to love and nurture her child".

O'Flynn appeared as Elizabeth Gough in the 2011 television film The Suspicions of Mr Whicher, and played the role of Beryl in BBC Four's BAFTA Award-winning television adaptation Room at the Top, based  on John Braine's novel of the same name, the following year. Also in 2012, she appeared as Liz in the British feature film comedy Up There, which was the winner of the Best Feature Film award at the 2012 British Academy Scotland Awards and was broadcast on BBC Two in August 2015.

In 2013, she performed at the National Theatre in its production of Simon Stephens' Port. Writing in The Guardian, Maddy Costa noted: "As Rachael […], she grew from a mouthy 11-year-old to a downtrodden but resilient 24-year-old – and in the process transformed from a relative unknown to a star in the making". Her performance won her the Critics' Circle's Jack Tinker Award for Most Promising Newcomer (other than a playwright). She returned to the National Theatre, playing Jo in its 2014 production of Shelagh Delaney's A Taste of Honey.

She appeared in the 2014 film Mr. Turner and in 2015 O'Flynn played the part of Dr Peep in police comedy drama No Offence. She reprised her role in series 2.

In 2016, O'Flynn played Myrtle in the BBC Radio 4 sitcom Dot set in the Cabinet War Rooms. In the same year, she also played Lady Alexandrina De Courcy in the ITV costume drama Doctor Thorne, based on Anthony Trollope's novel of the same name. O'Flynn played Alice Peabody, the new boss at Hard News in Bridget Jones' Baby.

Also in 2016, O'Flynn appeared in the BBC series Father Brown episode 5 and 6 "The Eagle and the Daw" as Katherine Corven. She reprised the character in the 2017 episode 6.2 "The Jackdaw's Revenge".

In 2019 O'Flynn played Victoria Woodcock in the 2019 television drama Brexit: The Uncivil War, written by James Graham. In 2021, she appeared in the miniseries Landscapers as DC Emma Lancing. In 2022, O'Flynn appeared in Death in Paradise as DI Neville Parker's sister Izzy. That year she was cast in Everyone Else Burns for Channel 4, playing Fiona, the wife of Simon Bird’s character David.

 Personal life 
O'Flynn's The House of Special Purpose'' (2009) co-star, Jonathan Bailey, calls her his "all-time bezzie" and together has hiked the Everest base camp in Nepal in 2018.

References

External links

British actresses
Alumni of RADA
People from Bury, Greater Manchester
1986 births
Living people